The Ring of Honour may be awarded on special occasions (personal anniversary, selection as the World Handball Player of the Year, etc.) to
outstanding individuals for their exceptional contribution to the sport of handball.

The Ring of Honour is made of gold and is specially engraved.

The recipient is selected by the Council at the request of the Executive Committee, and the Ring of Honour is awarded by the IHF President, one of the Vice-Presidents or the Secretary General.

List of Winners

External links
 IHF Statuts Chapter XXI - Regulations of Awards

International Handball Federation awards